The Queens Chronicle is a free weekly newspaper based in the New York City neighborhood of Rego Park, Queens. It was founded in November 1978 as The Paper by Susan Merzon.

In 1984, it expanded beyond its Howard Beach constituency and was renamed the Queens Chronicle.  In 1994, the paper's offices suffered a devastating fire.

The Chronicle has nine separate editions for various regions of Queens. Every Thursday, new editions of the Chronicle are distributed at more than 950 locations throughout the borough.  , the Chronicle publishes nine different weekly papers with a total circulation of 160,000, reaching 400,000 readers.

References

External links

Publications established in 1978
Newspapers published in Queens, New York
1978 establishments in New York City